"Now That I Found You" is a pop song by Canadian singer Carly Rae Jepsen. It was released as a double A-side single with "No Drug Like Me" on February 27, 2019 by 604, School Boy and Interscope Records, as the second advance single from Jepsen's fourth studio album, Dedicated. "Now That I Found You" was written by Jepsen, Ben Berger, Ryan McMahon, Ryan Rabin and Alexander O'Neill, while production was handled by Captain Cuts and Ayokay. According to Jepsen, "Now That I Found You" and "No Drug Like Me" are about "the giddy sugar rush of opening up to new love" and they "go thematically hand-in-hand".

Background
"Now That I Found You" was written at a songwriting camp in Nicaragua with Benjamin Berger, Ryan McMahon and Ryan Rabin of production team Captain Cuts and Alexander O'Neill, known professionally as Ayokay, in August 2017. It is a pop and synth-pop song with a "synth-heavy, '80s-inspired sound". Jepsen revealed that she wasn't in love when she wrote the song, and was just imagining how good she wanted to feel. She stated that the track "is about the high you get when a new love starts to change your life".

On February 13, 2019, "Now That I Found You" was featured in the teaser trailer for the third season of Queer Eye and the song was made available to pre-save on streaming services. On February 20, 2019, Jepsen revealed the single's cover and release date. On February 21 and 22, 2019, Jepsen released teaser videos with snippets of "Now That I Found You". On February 25, 2019, Jepsen announced that "No Drug Like Me" would be released alongside "Now That I Found You". A teaser video with a snippet of the song was released the following day. On February 27, 2019, "Now That I Found You" made its world premiere on Apple Music's Beats 1 radio as Zane Lowe's World Record.

Critical reception
Upon its release, "Now That I Found You" was named the Song of the Week by Consequence of Sound. Music critic Anthony Fantano highlighted it as one of the best songs on Dedicated. The Guardian journalist Betty Clarke selected "Now That I Found You" as one of the best tracks of 2019. In October 2022, Rachel Seo of Variety ranked it as Jepsen's eighth best song.

Year-end lists

Music video
The music video for "Now That I Found You" was directed by Carlos López Estrada and Nelson DeCastro, and premiered on March 14, 2019. It shows Jepsen caring for a lost tabby cat, which was portrayed by the celebrity cat, Shrampton. The video contains product placement for Abarth cars, the TikTok app, and Beats headphones, as well as references to the Cats on Synthesizers in Space Instagram account and the final scenes of the film Breakfast at Tiffany's. The idea to use a cat in the video was inspired by an actual cat who was adopted by Jepsen's partner at the time of recording the song's vocals. The singer said that the video's basis upon a cat rather than a person was partially inspired by her previous single "Party for One".

Live performances
Jepsen performed "Now That I Found You" for the first time on BBC Radio 1's Live Lounge on April 25, 2019. It was then included in the setlist of The Dedicated Tour.

Track listing

Charts

Release history

References

2019 singles
2019 songs
Carly Rae Jepsen songs
Songs written by Carly Rae Jepsen
Songs written by Ben Berger
604 Records singles
Schoolboy Records singles
Interscope Records singles
Songs written by Ryan McMahon (record producer)
Songs written by Ryan Rabin
Songs written by Alexander O'Neal
Song recordings produced by Captain Cuts